The 2010 OFC Under 17 tournament was the 1st edition of the OFC Women's Under 17 Qualifying Tournament which took place between 12 April – 16 April 2010 in New Zealand. The winner was New Zealand who were the Oceania Football Confederation representative at the 2010 FIFA U-17 Women's World Cup in Trinidad and Tobago.

Participating teams
 (host)

Matches

Goal scorers
8 goals
 Hannah Wong

7 goals
 Brittany Dudley-Smith

4 goals
 Kate Loye
 Holly Patterson

3 goals
 Ashleigh Ward

2 goals
 Olivia Chance
 Stephanie Skilton
 Georgina Kaikas

1 goal

 Katie Bowen
 Sivitha Boyce
 Hannah Carlsen
 Kate Carlton
 Evie Millynn
 Grace Parkinson
 Grace Steven
 Bianka Robert
 Corina Hasi
 Elizabeth Malau
 Mirriam Oneasi
 Merina Philip Joe
 Joy Timo
 Ella Vakatao

References

External links
Competition at OFC website

2010 in women's association football
OFC
2010
2010
Under
2010 in youth association football